Kistler may refer to:

Places
 Kistler, Pennsylvania, a borough in Mifflin County
 Kistler Creek, a tributary of Maiden Creek in Berks County, Pennsylvania
Kistler Valley, two locations; Antarctica and Pennsylvania
 Kistler Vineyards, in Sonoma Valley, California

Other
 Kistler Group, sensors and sensor electronics for measuring pressure, force, torque and acceleration
 Kistler Aerospace, former name of Rocketplane Kistler, company attempting to develop fully reusable vehicles

See also
 Kistler (surname)